General Salgado is a municipality in the state of São Paulo, Brazil. The city has a population of 10,862 inhabitants and an area of 493.3 km².

General Salgado belongs to the Mesoregion of São José do Rio Preto.

References

Municipalities in São Paulo (state)